The White Waltz (French: La valse blanche) is a 1943 French drama film directed by Jean Stelli and starring Lise Delamare, André Alerme and  Aimé Clariond. It was produced and released during the German occupation of France.

Synopsis
Bernard, a promising composer is engaged to Hélène, but is jealous of her relationship with Professor d'Estérel who she assists. After an argument he goes out into heavy rain and falls ill. He is sent to a sanatorium in the mountains to recover. There he encounters Jacqueline, a girl he once knew at the conservatoire, who is dying of tuberculosis. To try and soften the last weeks of her life he pretends to romance her. Hélène also helps to support this act of kindness.

Cast
 Lise Delamare as 	Hélène Madelin
 André Alerme as Monsieur Despillois 
 Aimé Clariond as 	Le professeur d'Estérel
 Julien Bertheau as	Bernard Lampré
 Ariane Borg as 	Jacqueline Lorbodsen dite Jackie
 Marcelle Géniat as Nany
 Raymond Cordy as Le peintre René Dupré
 Marcelle Monthil as Mademoiselle Zamb
 Michel de Bonnay as 	Jeannot
 Annette Poivre as 	Lily
 Paul Barge as 	Le concierge
 Lucien Desagneaux as Un élève du Conservatoire
 Luce Fabiole as La mère de Jeannot
 Georges Gosset as 	L'ami d'Hélène
 Albert Morys as 	Un malade	
 Maurice Tricard as Le docteur Bohains
 Roger Vincent as Le critique

References

Bibliography
 Rège, Philippe. Encyclopedia of French Film Directors, Volume 1. Scarecrow Press, 2009.
 Weber, Alain. La bataille du film: 1933-1945, le cinéma français entre allégeance et résistance. Ramsay, 2007.

External links 
 

1943 films
French drama films
1940s French-language films
1943 drama films
Films directed by Jean Stelli
Films set in Paris
1940s French films